Robb Steven White (born May 26, 1965) is a former American professional football player who was a defensive lineman in the National Football League (NFL) and the World League of American Football (WLAF). He played for the New York Giants and Tampa Bay Buccaneers of the NFL, and the San Antonio Riders of the WLAF. White played collegiately at the University of South Dakota.

References

1965 births
Living people
American football defensive tackles
American football defensive ends
New York Giants players
People from Aberdeen, South Dakota
Players of American football from South Dakota
San Antonio Riders players
South Dakota Coyotes football players
Tampa Bay Buccaneers players